The Northern Mariana Islands did not participate in the November 8, 2016 general election for President of the United States, because it is a territory and not a state. However, the five non-incorporated territories that send delegates to the House of Representatives participated in the presidential primaries of both major parties.

In the presidential primaries, voters expressed their preferences for the Democratic and Republican parties' respective nominees for president. Registered members of each party only voted in their party's primary, while voters who were unaffiliated chose any one primary in which to vote. The caucuses for both parties were held in March 2016.

Caucuses

Republican caucus 
Prior to the Republican caucus, Ralph Torres, the Governor of Northern Mariana Islands, endorsed Donald Trump. The Republican caucus took place on March 15, 2016:

Democratic caucus 
On January 11, 2016, Northern Mariana Islander delegate Gregorio Sablan endorsed Hillary Clinton. The Democratic caucus took place on March 12, 2016.

This was the first time that the Northern Mariana Islands participated in the Democratic caucuses.

See also 

 Democratic Party presidential debates, 2016
 Democratic Party presidential primaries, 2016
 Republican Party presidential debates, 2016
 Republican Party presidential primaries, 2016

References

External links
 RNC 2016 Republican Nominating Process 
 Green papers for 2016 primaries, caucuses, and conventions

Northern Mariana Islands
2016
Northern Mariana Islands
Presidential election